GaraSh is a Belarusian comedy film first released in 2015, directed by Andrei Kureichik.

Plot
This dark comedy about car mechanics working in the Shabany district on the outskirts of Minsk reveals a clash of civilisations. The young hero, born in Belarus, has lived and worked in the USA under the program Work & Travel five years, adopted that lifestyle and made the "American dream" his formula for happiness. On his return to Belarus he works in a Shabany garage which has its own philosophy; a different view of reality, closer to that of the Soviet Union.

Cast 
 Aleksandr Kullinkovich: Boris Grigorievich, senior mechanic 
 Yuri Naumov: Auto Electrician 
 Vitaly Kuren: Artem Borzov, «American»
 Vasily Nitsko: Ivan Ivanovich, a government official 
 Elizaveta Shukova: a client of the garage, the daughter of an official 
 Vadim Gaidukovsky: Seller of auto parts 
 Evelina Sakuro: Stripper
 Oleg Grushecki: Mechanic
 Egor Zabelov: Grisha, musician

References

2015 films
2010s Russian-language films
2010s crime comedy films
Belarusian comedy films
2015 comedy films